Vereen is both a surname and given name. Notable people with the name include:

 Vereen Bell (1911–1944), American novelist and naval officer
 Ben Vereen (born 1946), American actor, dancer, and singer
 Brock Vereen (born 1992), American football safety
 Carl Vereen (born 1936), American football offensive tackle
 Corey Vereen (born 1995), American football player
 Shane Vereen (born 1989), American football running back
 Wendy Vereen (born 1966), American track and field sprinter